Hisham Al-Masri (born 27 February 1973) is a Syrian former swimmer who competed in the 1992 Summer Olympics and in the 1996 Summer Olympics.

References

1973 births
Living people
Syrian male freestyle swimmers
Olympic swimmers of Syria
Swimmers at the 1992 Summer Olympics
Swimmers at the 1996 Summer Olympics
Medalists at the 1994 Asian Games
Medalists at the 1998 Asian Games
Asian Games gold medalists for Syria
Asian Games silver medalists for Syria
Asian Games bronze medalists for Syria
Asian Games medalists in swimming
Swimmers at the 1990 Asian Games
Swimmers at the 1994 Asian Games
Swimmers at the 1998 Asian Games
Mediterranean Games gold medalists for Syria
Swimmers at the 1993 Mediterranean Games
Mediterranean Games medalists in swimming